Andrew Wang or Wang Hui-jun (born 29 November 1945), usually cited as Andrew H. J. Wang, is a Taiwanese biochemist.

Biography
Wang earned a bachelor's and master's degree from National Taiwan University in 1967 and 1970, respectively. He then pursued a doctorate at the University of Illinois at Urbana–Champaign. He was a research scientist at the Massachusetts Institute of Technology between 1974 and 1988, when he returned to UIUC as a faculty member. Wang returned to Taiwan in 2000 for a position at Academia Sinica. Wang is noted for his research into PTPN3-protein kinase 12 complex and has identified ICP11 as a DNA mimic protein.

Wang was elected a fellow of the American Society for Biochemistry and Molecular Biology and American Institute of Chemists in 1987. The next year, Wang was elected a fellow of the American Association for the Advancement of Science. Wang's election as a member of Academia Sinica took place in 2000, and he became a fellow of The World Academy of Sciences in 2005.

Wang served as president of the Taiwan Society of Biochemistry and Molecular Biology between 2001 and 2004, the Biophysical Society of the Republic of China from 2001 to 2007, and the Taiwan Proteomics Society from 2003 and 2006. Wang was appointed one of three vice presidents of Academia Sinica under Wong Chi-huey in 2006. He was president of the Federation of Asian Oceanian Biochemists and Molecular Biologists between 2011 and 2013, and took office as president of the International Union of Biochemistry and Molecular Biology in 2018. In October 2018, Wang was appointed inaugural director of the National Biotechnology Research Park, a position he took in an acting capacity.

References

1945 births
Living people
20th-century Taiwanese scientists
21st-century Taiwanese scientists
Taiwanese biochemists
Massachusetts Institute of Technology staff
Members of Academia Sinica
National Taiwan University alumni
University of Illinois Urbana-Champaign alumni
University of Illinois Urbana-Champaign faculty
Taiwanese expatriates in the United States
Fellows of the American Association for the Advancement of Science
TWAS fellows
Presidents of the International Union of Biochemistry and Molecular Biology